Halil İbrahim Sevinç (born 24 January 2002) is a Turkish professional footballer who plays as a midfielder for Serik Belediyespor on loan from Bodrumspor.

Professional career
Sevinç made his professional debut with Antalyaspor in a 3-3 Turkish Cup tie with Göztepe on 14 January 2019.

International career
Sevinç is a youth international for Turkey.

References

External links
 
 
 
 Antalyaspor Profile

2002 births
Sportspeople from Antalya
Living people
Turkish footballers
Turkey youth international footballers
Association football midfielders
Antalyaspor footballers
TFF Second League players